Teraa Surroor is a 2016 Indian Hindi-language thriller film directed by Shawn Arranha and produced by Vipin Reshammiya and Sonia Kapoor. It is sequel to 2007 film Aap Kaa Surroor. The film was a joint production of T-Series and HR Musik Limited. The film stars Himesh Reshammiya and Farah Karimae in the lead roles. Naseeruddin Shah, Shekhar Kapur, Kabir Bedi, and Monica Dogra play the supporting roles. Teraa Surroor was released on 11 March 2016 in over 1000 cinemas all over India. The basic plot of the movie was based on the 2010 Hollywood film The Next Three Days which itself was a remake of 2008 French movie Anything for Her.

Plot
The film begins with the murder of two Indian origin men in Ireland being killed by a masked man. The story then shifts to Tara Wadia, who is a singer and the girlfriend of a businessman-cum-gangster Raghu and lives with her mother. Raghu, it is revealed, is much in the eyes of the law.

One day, Raghu confesses to Tara that he had spent a night with a prostitute unintentionally. Disappointed, Tara breaks up with him and decides to leave for Ireland, despite her mother trying to convince her of Raghu's goodwill. However, the moment she lands in Dublin, she gets detained after being caught with drugs. Tara calls Raghu for help. Now he must help her and find Anirudh Brahman, the stranger who befriended Tara on Facebook and invited her to Ireland.

Raghu hires a lawyer, Elle Jordan, to rescue Tara and tries to get her bailed out, but the plea is rejected by the judiciary. Fearing a supposedly insurmountable life sentence, Raghu decides to help Tara, during which time, it is revealed that in childhood, he used to work for a gangster, Aurangzeb, who was badly wanted by the law, simply because Aurangzeb had held his mother a slave and she was in need of an operation, for which Raghu wanted money. A man named Anthony, instead, promised to give money for his mother's operation, and Raghu was trained in using a pistol to shoot Aurangzeb. When he proceeded with the task, he initially hesitated to shoot the gangster, but when Aurangzeb insulted his mother, Raghu shot him multiple times without a second thought.

Raghu consults with Robin Dharamraj Santino, an infamous convict who has escaped 14 times from prison. Robin says that he would charge him 20 mins each to help him, and Raghu agrees. Robin briefs him all plans and procedures and warns him that he must get Tara out of jail just within 20 minutes before the entire city would lock down by an automatic system. Succeeding in helping Tara escape, Raghu stays back for fighting the cops to buy her time.

After a successful escape, Raghu reconciles with Tara after revealing to her that his act of sleeping with the prostitute was actually part of a plan, and that he is actually an undercover assassin who has previously killed many criminals on behalf of Commissioner Afzal A. Khan. Seconds later, he is informed of Anirudh Brahman's location, and upon reaching there, is shocked to find Haider, Tara's close friend and associate, who confesses that he wanted to trap Raghu out of revenge for having killed Aurangzeb, who, it turns out, was his father. Raghu kills him and reunites with Tara. After being freed from prison, Tara reunited with her mother, along with Raghu, in her home.

Cast
 Himesh Reshammiya as Raghu, a gangster and boyfriend of Tara
 Farah Karimaee as Tara Wadia, Raghu's girlfriend
 Naseeruddin Shah as Robin "Bird" Dharamraj Santino, a criminal who helps Raghu
 Shekhar Kapur as Rajeev Kaul, India's Ambassador in Ireland
 Monica Dogra as Elle Jordan, Tara's lawyer
 Kabir Bedi as AA Khan, Indian Police Commissioner
 Shernaz Patel as Tara's mother
 Suneel Dutt as Drug trafficker
 Myles Molloy as Police Officer Graham Molloy
 Ann Marie O'Connor as Policewoman
 Richard O'Leary as Policeman
 Warren Renwick as Policeman
 Maneesh Chandra Bhatt as Anthony
 Niraj Singh as Farooq Ansari
 Ravi Singh as Indian Man
 Tereza as Neon, a call girl
 Naresh Suri as Indian Police Officer
 Degnan Geraghty as Col. Trueman Head of Irish Intelligence
 Abhishek Duhan as Haider / Anirudh Brahman

Production

Marketing
The details about the film were unveiled in December 2015. On 27 January 2016, T-Series released the trailer on YouTube and also unveiled the first look poster through Twitter. Two other posters were also released later. On 24 February 2016, another poster was released.

Development
Reshammiya also did tours before release of the film. He performed in Amsterdam and in different cities of India including Pune, Surat, Hyderabad, Kolkata and New Delhi. Reshammiya also visited Ajmer Sharif Dargah on 8 March 2016 with Farah Karimaee to offer prayers for the success of Teraa Surroor. The director Shawan Arranha has told that the budget of the film was recovered through the music even before the release of film. Arranha said: "The producers have already recovered the film's cost through sale of music, satellite and other rights".

Filming
The shooting began in the end of 2015. The film was mostly shot in Dublin, Ireland and a small part was also filmed in India.

Soundtrack

The soundtrack of Teraa Surroor was composed by Reshammiya. The first track of the soundtrack, titled Main Woh Chaand was released on 29 January 2016. It was sung by Darshan Raval. The soundtrack received positive reviews. Mohar Basu of The Times of India rated the music 3 out of 5 where as Sreeju Sudhakaran of Bollywood Life rated the soundtrack 4 out 5. Preeti Lopes of Bollywood capsule rated the album 4.5 out of 5, stating, "the music album of ‘Teraa Surroor’ is the best of the year so far. Versatile singing, heart touching lyrics and engrossing compositions along with some great opportunities provided by Himesh Reshammiya to the upcoming talent that our country has in abundance." Badshah also sang the song Teri Yaad with Reshammiya

Track listing

Release
The official trailer of the film was released on 27 January 2016. The film was released on 11 March 2016. It was released in more than 1,700 cinemas across India, with over 5,800 shows per day.

Reception

Box office
The film collected  in two weeks after release in India.

It grossed  on the first two days. On the first weekend, film grossed , beating Saala Khadoos which collected  on its opening weekend. It reached  on the seventh day. Teraa Surroor also entered the list of Top 10 Highest Opening Weekend Grosses of 2016 in India. The film did decent business at box office.

Soundtrack reception 
The soundtrack received positive reviews from Bollywood Hungama, Bolly Spice, and Blog to Bollywood. India-West rated the album 2.5 stars out of 5.

Critical reception

The film mostly gained negative reviews in the critics.

Shubhra Gupta of The Indian Express said that Himesh Reshammiya's film is a mess. He also said: "The focus stays firmly on Himesh, who remains blank-faced through it all, never cracking a single smile, not even when he is with his girl. All in tons of slo mo, alternating with dizzying camera angles. All drowned in loud background music". Gupta rated the film with a half star.

Saibal Chatterjee of NDTV Movies said: "Teraa Surroor dives deep into a sea of mothballed ideas. No wonders the exercise yields no pearls". He rated the film 1.5 out of 5.

BollywoodLife.com rated 3 out of 5. He said: "Teraa Surroor delivers as a true Himesh Reshammiya film. It is a typical masala entertainer with some great music. If you liked Aap Kaa Surroor, then Teraa Surroor definitely won't disappoint."

Surabhi Redkar of koimoi.com said: "Watching Himesh Reshammiya try to act like an enticing hero wooing ladies and making the worst of face ever!" He gave 1 star out of five.

References

External links

 
 

2016 films
2010s Hindi-language films
T-Series (company) films
HR Musik films
Indian romantic thriller films
2016 action thriller films
Indian action thriller films
Indian remakes of French films
Indian remakes of American films
2010s romantic thriller films
Films set in Dublin (city)
Films set in the Republic of Ireland
Films shot in Dublin (city)
Films shot in County Dublin
Films shot in the Republic of Ireland